Michael Joseph Ryan (18 July 1897 – 1 August 1965) was an Australian amateur golfer who won the Australian Open in 1932. He also played Australian rules football for South Melbourne in the Victorian Football League (VFL).

Ryan made just one senior appearance for South Melbourne, in the 1918 VFL season, when they defeated Richmond in a game at Lake Oval. South Melbourne went on to win the premiership that year.

Ryan joined the Royal Park Golf Club in 1925 and won their Championship the following year. He later went to Kingston Heath.

In 2002 he was named as one of the twelve members of the Victorian golfing team of the 20th century.

Tournament wins
1929 Australian Amateur
1930 Victorian Amateur Championship
1932 Victorian Amateur Championship, Australian Open
1933 Riversdale Cup
1935 Riversdale Cup
1937 Queensland Amateur

Team appearances
Kirk-Windeyer Cup (representing Victoria): 1929, 1930
Australian Men's Interstate Teams Matches (representing Victoria): 1929 (winners), 1930 (winners), 1931 (winners), 1932, 1933 (winners), 1934, 1935, 1936 (winners), 1937, 1939 (winners), 1946

References

Australian male golfers
Amateur golfers
Golfers from Melbourne
Australian rules footballers from Melbourne
Sydney Swans players
People from Port Melbourne
1897 births
1965 deaths